Jizz may refer to:
Jizz (birding), the immediately recognisable characteristics of a bird or other organism
Jizz, a vulgar slang for semen
"Jizz", an episode of season 1 of Satisfaction
Jizz, a PC 64k intro by The Black Lotus at Wired 1997
Jizz, a character on Beaver Falls
Jizz, the genre of music played by the Max Rebo Band in Star Wars
 Jizz Hornkamp (born 1998), Dutch footballer

See also